Peschany is a rural locality (a village) in Bulgakovsky Selsoviet, Ufimsky District, Bashkortostan, Russia. The population was 181 as of 2010. There is 1 street.

Geography 
Peschany is located 34 km south of Ufa (the district's administrative centre) by road. Stukolkino is the nearest rural locality.

References 

Rural localities in Ufimsky District